Chobera is a genus of moths of the family Crambidae. It contains only one species, Chobera pallida, which is found in India. It was first described by Frederic Moore in 1888.

References

Pyraustinae
Crambidae genera
Taxa named by Frederic Moore